Hugo Varela (born 30 June 1992 in Vigo) is a Spanish professional squash player. As of December 2020, he was ranked number 129 in the world.

References

1992 births
Living people
Spanish male squash players